Ardhiansah Pramesthu (born July 21, 2002) is an Indonesian professional footballer who plays as an attacking midfielder.

Club career

Barito Putera
He was signed for Barito Putera to play in Liga 1 in the 2021 season. Ardhiansah made his professional debut on 20 October 2021 in a match against PSIS Semarang at the Sultan Agung Stadium, Bantul.

Career statistics

Club

Notes

References

External links
 Ardhiansah Pramesthu at Soccerway
 Ardhiansah Pramesthu at Liga Indonesia

2002 births
Living people
Indonesian footballers
PS Barito Putera players
Association football midfielders
People from Bantul Regency